Boragangechuv (Razaq̇-Otar) is a rural locality (a selo) in Khasavyurtovsky District, Republic of Dagestan, Russia. The population was 1,635 as of 2010. There are 28 streets.

Geography 
Boragangechuv is located 24 km northwest of Khasavyurt (the district's administrative centre) by road. Khamavyurt is the nearest rural locality.

References 

Rural localities in Khasavyurtovsky District